<noinclude>

Established in 1975 and headquartered in Paris, ESA has a worldwide staff of about 2,200 in 2018 and an annual budget of about €4.9 billion in 2023.

ESA's space flight programme includes human spaceflight (mainly through participation in the International Space Station program); the launch and operation of unmanned exploration missions to other planets and the Moon; Earth observation, science and telecommunication; designing launch vehicles; and maintaining a major spaceport, the Guiana Space Centre at Kourou (French Guiana), France. The main European launch vehicle Ariane 5 is operated through Arianespace with ESA sharing in the costs of launching and further developing this launch vehicle. The agency is also working with NASA to manufacture the Orion spacecraft service module that will fly on the Space Launch System.

History

Foundation

After World War II, many European scientists left Western Europe in order to work with the United States. Although the 1950s boom made it possible for Western European countries to invest in research and specifically in space-related activities, Western European scientists realised solely national projects would not be able to compete with the two main superpowers. In 1958, only months after the Sputnik shock, Edoardo Amaldi (Italy) and Pierre Auger (France), two prominent members of the Western European scientific community, met to discuss the foundation of a common Western European space agency. The meeting was attended by scientific representatives from eight countries.

The Western European nations decided to have two agencies: one concerned with developing a launch system, ELDO (European Launcher Development Organisation), and the other the precursor of the European Space Agency, ESRO (European Space Research Organisation). The latter was established on 20 March 1964 by an agreement signed on 14 June 1962. From 1968 to 1972, ESRO launched seven research satellites, but ELDO was not able to deliver a launch vehicle. Both agencies struggled with underfunding and diverging interests of its participants.

ESA in its current form was founded with the ESA Convention in 1975, when ESRO was merged with ELDO. ESA had ten founding member states: Belgium, Denmark, France, West Germany, Italy, the Netherlands, Spain, Sweden, Switzerland, and the United Kingdom. These signed the ESA Convention in 1975 and deposited the instruments of ratification by 1980, when the convention came into force. During this interval the agency functioned in a de facto fashion. ESA launched its first major scientific mission in 1975, Cos-B, a space probe monitoring gamma-ray emissions in the universe, which was first worked on by ESRO.

Later activities

ESA collaborated with NASA on the International Ultraviolet Explorer (IUE), the world's first high-orbit telescope, which was launched in 1978 and operated successfully for 18 years. A number of successful Earth-orbit projects followed, and in 1986 ESA began Giotto, its first deep-space mission, to study the comets Halley and Grigg–Skjellerup. Hipparcos, a star-mapping mission, was launched in 1989 and in the 1990s SOHO, Ulysses and the Hubble Space Telescope were all jointly carried out with NASA. Later scientific missions in cooperation with NASA include the Cassini–Huygens space probe, to which ESA contributed by building the Titan landing module Huygens.

As the successor of ELDO, ESA has also constructed rockets for scientific and commercial payloads. Ariane 1, launched in 1979, carried mostly commercial payloads into orbit from 1984 onward. The next two versions of the Ariane rocket were intermediate stages in the development of a more advanced launch system, the Ariane 4, which operated between 1988 and 2003 and established ESA as the world leader in commercial space launches in the 1990s. Although the succeeding Ariane 5 experienced a failure on its first flight, it has since firmly established itself within the heavily competitive commercial space launch market with 112 successful launches until 2021. The successor launch vehicle, the Ariane 6, is under development and is envisioned to enter service in late 2023.

The beginning of the new millennium saw ESA become, along with agencies like NASA, JAXA, ISRO, the CSA and Roscosmos, one of the major participants in scientific space research. Although ESA had relied on co-operation with NASA in previous decades, especially the 1990s, changed circumstances (such as tough legal restrictions on information sharing by the United States military) led to decisions to rely more on itself and on co-operation with Russia. A 2011 press issue thus stated:

Notable ESA programmes include SMART-1, a probe testing cutting-edge space propulsion technology, the Mars Express and Venus Express missions, as well as the development of the Ariane 5 rocket and its role in the ISS partnership. ESA maintains its scientific and research projects mainly for astronomy-space missions such as Corot, launched on 27 December 2006, a milestone in the search for exoplanets.

On 21 January 2019, ArianeGroup and Arianespace announced a one-year contract with ESA to study and prepare for a mission to mine the Moon for lunar regolith.

In 2021 the ESA ministerial council agreed to the "Matosinhos manifesto" which set three priority areas (referred to as accelerators) "space for a green future, a rapid and resilient crisis response, and the protection of space assets", and two further high visibility projects (referred to as inspirators) an icy moon sample return mission; and human space exploration. In the same year the recruitment process began for the 2022 European Space Agency Astronaut Group.

Facilities
The agency's facilities date back to ESRO and are deliberately distributed among various countries and areas. The most important are the following centres:

ESA headquarter is in Paris, France
ESA science missions are based at ESTEC in Noordwijk, Netherlands;
Earth Observation missions at ESA Centre for Earth Observation in Frascati, Italy;
ESA Mission Control (ESOC) is in Darmstadt, Germany;
the European Astronaut Centre (EAC) that trains astronauts for future missions is situated in Cologne, Germany;
the European Centre for Space Applications and Telecommunications (ECSAT), a research institute created in 2009, is located in Harwell, England;
the European Space Astronomy Centre (ESAC) is located in Villanueva de la Cañada, Madrid, Spain.
the European Space Security and Education Centre (ESEC), located in Redu, Belgium; 
the ESTRACK tracking and deep space communication network.
Many other facilities are operated by national space agencies in close collaboration with ESA.
Esrange near Kiruna in Sweden.
Guiana Space Centre in Kourou, France
Toulouse Space Centre, France.
Institute of Space Propulsion in Lampoldshausen, Germany.
Columbus Control Centre in Oberpfaffenhofen, Germany.

Mission
The treaty establishing the European Space Agency reads:

ESA is responsible for setting a unified space and related industrial policy, recommending space objectives to the member states, and integrating national programs like satellite development, into the European program as much as possible.

Jean-Jacques Dordain – ESA's Director General (2003–2015) – outlined the European Space Agency's mission in a 2003 interview:

Activities and programmes

ESA describes its work in two overlapping ways:
 For the general public, the various fields of work are described as "Activities".
 Budgets are organised as "Programmes".

These are either mandatory or optional.

Activities
According to the ESA website, the activities are:
Observing the Earth
Human Spaceflight
Launchers
Navigation
Space Science
Space Engineering & Technology
Operations
Telecommunications & Integrated Applications
Preparing for the Future
Space for Climate

Programmes

 Moonlight Initiative

Mandatory
Every member country must contribute to these programmes: The European Space Agency Science Programme is a long-term programme of space science and space exploration missions.

Technology Development Element Programme
Science Core Technology Programme
General Study Programme
European Component Initiative

Optional
Depending on their individual choices the countries can contribute to the following programmes, listed according to:

ESA_LAB@
ESA has formed partnerships with universities. ESA_LAB@ refers to research laboratories at universities. Currently there are ESA_LAB@

Università Bocconi
Technische Universität Darmstadt
École des hautes études commerciales de Paris (HEC Paris)
Université de recherche Paris Sciences et Lettres
University of Central Lancashire
University College London

Member states, funding and budget

Membership and contribution to ESA

By 2015, ESA was an intergovernmental organisation of 22 member states. Member states participate to varying degrees in the mandatory (25% of total expenditures in 2008) and optional space programmes (75% of total expenditures in 2008). The 2008 budget amounted to €3.0 billion whilst the 2009 budget amounted to €3.6 billion. The total budget amounted to about €3.7 billion in 2010, €3.99 billion in 2011, €4.02 billion in 2012, €4.28 billion in 2013, €4.10 billion in 2014 and €4.33 billion in 2015.

English is the main language within ESA. Additionally, official documents are also provided in German and documents regarding the Spacelab are also provided in Italian. If found appropriate, the agency may conduct its correspondence in any language of a member state.

The following table lists all the member states and adjunct members, their ESA convention ratification dates, and their contributions in 2022:

Non-full member states
Previously associated members were Austria, Norway and Finland, all of which later joined ESA as full members

Slovenia
Since 2016, Slovenia has been an associated member of the ESA.

Latvia
Latvia became the second current associated member on 30 June 2020, when the Association Agreement was signed by ESA Director Jan Wörner and the Minister of Education and Science of Latvia, Ilga Šuplinska in Riga. The Saeima ratified it on 27 July.

Lithuania
In May 2021, Lithuania became the third current associated member. As a consequence its citizens became eligible to apply to the 2022 ESA Astronaut group, applications for which were scheduled to close one week later. The deadline was therefore extended by three weeks to allow Lithuanians a fair chance to apply.

Slovakia
Slovakia’s Associate membership came into effect on 13 October 2022, for an initial duration of seven years. The Association Agreement supersedes the European Cooperating State (ECS) Agreement, which entered into force upon Slovakia’s subscription to the Plan for European Cooperating States Charter on 4 February 2016, a scheme introduced at ESA in 2001. The ECS Agreement was subsequently extended until 3 August 2022.

Canada
Since 1 January 1979, Canada has had the special status of a Cooperating State within ESA. By virtue of this accord, the Canadian Space Agency takes part in ESA's deliberative bodies and decision-making and also in ESA's programmes and activities. Canadian firms can bid for and receive contracts to work on programmes. The accord has a provision ensuring a fair industrial return to Canada. The most recent Cooperation Agreement was signed on 15 December 2010 with a term extending to 2020. For 2014, Canada's annual assessed contribution to the ESA general budget was €6,059,449 (CAD$8,559,050). For 2017, Canada has increased its annual contribution to €21,600,000 (CAD$30,000,000).

Budget appropriation and allocation

ESA is funded from annual contributions by individual states as well as from an annual contribution by the European Union (EU).

The budget of ESA was €5.250 billion in 2016. Every 3–4 years, ESA member states agree on a budget plan for several years at an ESA member states conference. This plan can be amended in future years, however provides the major guideline for ESA for several years.  The 2016 budget allocations for major areas of ESA activity are shown in the chart on the right.

Countries typically have their own space programmes that differ in how they operate organisationally and financially with ESA. For example, the French space agency CNES has a total budget of €2015 million, of which €755 million is paid as direct financial contribution to ESA. Several space-related projects are joint projects between national space agencies and ESA (e.g. COROT). Also, ESA is not the only European governmental space organisation (for example European Union Satellite Centre and the European Union Space Programme Agency).

Enlargement

After the decision of the ESA Council of 21/22 March 2001, the procedure for accession of the European states was detailed as described the document titled "The Plan for European Co-operating States (PECS)". Nations that want to become a full member of ESA do so in 3 stages. First a Cooperation Agreement is signed between the country and ESA. In this stage, the country has very limited financial responsibilities. If a country wants to co-operate more fully with ESA, it signs a European Cooperating State (ECS) Agreement. The ECS Agreement makes companies based in the country eligible for participation in ESA procurements. The country can also participate in all ESA programmes, except for the Basic Technology Research Programme. While the financial contribution of the country concerned increases, it is still much lower than that of a full member state. The agreement is normally followed by a Plan For European Cooperating State (or PECS Charter). This is a 5-year programme of basic research and development activities aimed at improving the nation's space industry capacity. At the end of the 5-year period, the country can either begin negotiations to become a full member state or an associated state or sign a new PECS Charter. Many countries, most of which joined the EU in both 2004 and 2007, have started to co-operate with ESA on various levels:

During the Ministerial Meeting in December 2014, ESA ministers approved a resolution calling for discussions to begin with Israel, Australia and South Africa on future association agreements. The ministers noted that "concrete cooperation is at an advanced stage" with these nations and that "prospects for mutual benefits are existing".

A separate space exploration strategy resolution calls for further co-operation with the United States, Russia and China on "LEO exploration, including a continuation of ISS cooperation and the development of a robust plan for the coordinated use of space transportation vehicles and systems for exploration purposes, participation in robotic missions for the exploration of the Moon, the robotic exploration of Mars, leading to a broad Mars Sample Return mission in which Europe should be involved as a full partner, and human missions beyond LEO in the longer term."

In August 2019, ESA and the Australian Space Agency signed a joint statement of intent "to explore deeper cooperation and identify projects in a range of areas including deep space, communications, navigation, remote asset management, data analytics and mission support." Details of the cooperation were laid out in a framework agreement signed by the two nations.

On 17 November 2020, ESA signed a memorandum of understanding (MOU) with the South African National Space Agency (SANSA). SANSA CEO Dr. Valanathan Munsami tweeted: "Today saw another land mark event for SANSA with the signing of an MoU with ESA. This builds on initiatives that we have been discussing for a while already and which gives effect to these. Thanks Jan for your hand of friendship and making this possible."

Launch vehicle fleet
ESA has a fleet of different launch vehicles in service with which it competes in all sectors of the launch market. ESA's fleet consists of three major rocket designs: Ariane 5, Soyuz-2 and Vega. Rocket launches are carried out by Arianespace, which has 23 shareholders representing the industry that manufactures the Ariane 5 as well as CNES, at ESA's Guiana Space Centre. Because many communication satellites have equatorial orbits, launches from French Guiana are able to take larger payloads into space than from spaceports at higher latitudes. In addition, equatorial launches give spacecraft an extra 'push' of nearly 500 m/s due to the higher rotational velocity of the Earth at the equator compared to near the Earth's poles where rotational velocity approaches zero.

Ariane 5

The Ariane 5 rocket is ESA's primary launcher. It has been in service since 1997 and replaced Ariane 4. Two different variants are currently in use. It failed during its first test flight in 2002, but has since made 82 consecutive successful flights until a partial failure in January 2018. The other version, was used to launch the Automated Transfer Vehicle (ATV) to the International Space Station (ISS) and will be used to launch four Galileo navigational satellites at a time.

In November 2012, ESA agreed to build an upgraded variant called  (Mid-life Evolution) which would increase payload capacity to 11.5 tonnes to GTO and feature a restartable second stage to allow more complex missions. Ariane 5 ME was scheduled to fly in 2018, but the project was abandoned in favour of Ariane 6, which is planned to replace Ariane 5 in the 2020s.

ESA's Ariane 1, 2, 3 and 4 launchers (the last of which was ESA's long-time workhorse) have been retired. The Ariane 6 will replace the Ariane 5 in late 2022.

Vega

Vega is ESA's carrier for small satellites. Developed by seven ESA members led by Italy, it is capable of carrying a payload with a mass of between 300 and 1500 kg to an altitude of 700 km, for low polar orbit. Its maiden launch from Kourou was on 13 February 2012. Vega began full commercial exploitation in December 2015.

The rocket has three solid propulsion stages and a liquid propulsion upper stage (the AVUM) for accurate orbital insertion and the ability to place multiple payloads into different orbits.

A larger version of the Vega launcher, Vega-C is in development and the first flight is expected in June 2021. The new evolution of the rocket incorporates a larger first stage booster, the P120C replacing the P80, an upgraded Zefiro (rocket stage) second stage, and the AVUM+ upper stage. This new variant enables larger single payloads, dual payloads, return missions, and orbital transfer capabilities.

Ariane launch vehicle development funding
Historically, the Ariane family rockets have been funded primarily "with money contributed by ESA governments seeking to participate in the program rather than through competitive industry bids. This [has meant that] governments commit multiyear funding to the development with the expectation of a roughly 90% return on investment in the form of industrial workshare." ESA is proposing changes to this scheme by moving to competitive bids for the development of the Ariane 6.

Future rocket development
Future projects include the Prometheus reusable engine technology demonstrator, Phoebus (an upgraded second stage for Ariane 6), and Themis (a reusable first stage).

Human space flight

Formation and development

At the time ESA was formed, its main goals did not encompass human space flight; rather it considered itself to be primarily a scientific research organisation for uncrewed space exploration in contrast to its American and Soviet counterparts. It is therefore not surprising that the first non-Soviet European in space was not an ESA astronaut on a European space craft; it was Czechoslovak Vladimír Remek who in 1978 became the first non-Soviet or American in space (the first man in space being Yuri Gagarin of the Soviet Union) – on a Soviet Soyuz spacecraft, followed by the Pole Mirosław Hermaszewski and East German Sigmund Jähn in the same year. This Soviet co-operation programme, known as Intercosmos, primarily involved the participation of Eastern bloc countries. In 1982, however, Jean-Loup Chrétien became the first non-Communist Bloc astronaut on a flight to the Soviet Salyut 7 space station.

Because Chrétien did not officially fly into space as an ESA astronaut, but rather as a member of the French CNES astronaut corps, the German Ulf Merbold is considered the first ESA astronaut to fly into space. He participated in the STS-9 Space Shuttle mission that included the first use of the European-built Spacelab in 1983. STS-9 marked the beginning of an extensive ESA/NASA joint partnership that included dozens of space flights of ESA astronauts in the following years. Some of these missions with Spacelab were fully funded and organisationally and scientifically controlled by ESA (such as two missions by Germany and one by Japan) with European astronauts as full crew members rather than guests on board. Beside paying for Spacelab flights and seats on the shuttles, ESA continued its human space flight co-operation with the Soviet Union and later Russia, including numerous visits to Mir.

During the latter half of the 1980s, European human space flights changed from being the exception to routine and therefore, in 1990, the European Astronaut Centre in Cologne, Germany was established. It selects and trains prospective astronauts and is responsible for the co-ordination with international partners, especially with regard to the International Space Station. As of 2006, the ESA astronaut corps officially included twelve members, including nationals from most large European countries except the United Kingdom.

In 2008, ESA started to recruit new astronauts so that final selection would be due in spring 2009. Almost 10,000 people registered as astronaut candidates before registration ended in June 2008. 8,413 fulfilled the initial application criteria. Of the applicants, 918 were chosen to take part in the first stage of psychological testing, which narrowed down the field to 192. After two-stage psychological tests and medical evaluation in early 2009, as well as formal interviews, six new members of the European Astronaut Corps were selected – five men and one woman.

List of astronauts

The astronauts of the European Space Agency are:

France Jean-François Clervoy
Italy Samantha Cristoforetti
Belgium Frank De Winne
Spain Pedro Duque
Germany Reinhold Ewald
France Léopold Eyharts
Germany Alexander Gerst
Italy Umberto Guidoni
Sweden Christer Fuglesang
Netherlands André Kuipers
Germany Matthias Maurer
Denmark Andreas Mogensen
Italy Paolo Nespoli
Switzerland Claude Nicollier
Italy Luca Parmitano
United Kingdom Timothy Peake
France Philippe Perrin
France Thomas Pesquet
Germany Thomas Reiter
Germany Hans Schlegel
Germany Gerhard Thiele
France Michel Tognini
Italy Roberto Vittori

Crew vehicles
In the 1980s, France pressed for an independent European crew launch vehicle. Around 1978, it was decided to pursue a reusable spacecraft model and starting in November 1987 a project to create a mini-shuttle by the name of Hermes was introduced. The craft was comparable to early proposals for the Space Shuttle and consisted of a small reusable spaceship that would carry 3 to 5 astronauts and 3 to 4 metric tons of payload for scientific experiments. With a total maximum weight of 21 metric tons it would have been launched on the Ariane 5 rocket, which was being developed at that time. It was planned solely for use in low Earth orbit space flights. The planning and pre-development phase concluded in 1991; the production phase was never fully implemented because at that time the political landscape had changed significantly. With the fall of the Soviet Union ESA looked forward to co-operation with Russia to build a next-generation space vehicle. Thus the Hermes programme was cancelled in 1995 after about 3 billion dollars had been spent. The Columbus space station programme had a similar fate.

In the 21st century, ESA started new programmes in order to create its own crew vehicles, most notable among its various projects and proposals is Hopper, whose prototype by EADS, called Phoenix, has already been tested. While projects such as Hopper are neither concrete nor to be realised within the next decade, other possibilities for human spaceflight in co-operation with the Russian Space Agency have emerged. Following talks with the Russian Space Agency in 2004 and June 2005, a co-operation between ESA and the Russian Space Agency was announced to jointly work on the Russian-designed Kliper, a reusable spacecraft that would be available for space travel beyond LEO (e.g. the moon or even Mars). It was speculated that Europe would finance part of it. A €50 million participation study for Kliper, which was expected to be approved in December 2005, was finally not approved by the ESA member states. The Russian state tender for the project was subsequently cancelled in 2006.

In June 2006, ESA member states granted 15 million to the Crew Space Transportation System (CSTS) study, a two-year study to design a spacecraft capable of going beyond Low-Earth orbit based on the current Soyuz design. This project was pursued with Roskosmos instead of the cancelled Kliper proposal. A decision on the actual implementation and construction of the CSTS spacecraft was contemplated for 2008.
In mid-2009 EADS Astrium was awarded a €21 million study into designing a crew vehicle based on the European ATV which is believed to now be the basis of the Advanced Crew Transportation System design.

In November 2012, ESA decided to join NASA's Orion programme. The ATV would form the basis of a propulsion unit for NASA's new crewed spacecraft. ESA may also seek to work with NASA on Orion's launch system as well in order to secure a seat on the spacecraft for its own astronauts.

In September 2014, ESA signed an agreement with Sierra Nevada Corporation for co-operation in Dream Chaser project. Further studies on the Dream Chaser for European Utilization or DC4EU project were funded, including the feasibility of launching a Europeanised Dream Chaser onboard Ariane 5.

Cooperation with other countries and organisations
ESA has signed co-operation agreements with the following states that currently neither plan to integrate as tightly with ESA institutions as Canada, nor envision future membership of ESA: Argentina, Brazil, China, India (for the Chandrayan mission), Russia and Turkey.

Additionally, ESA has joint projects with the EUSPA of the European Union, NASA of the United States and is participating in the International Space Station together with the United States (NASA), Russia and Japan (JAXA).

National space organisations of member states
The Centre National d'Études Spatiales (CNES) (National Centre for Space Study) is the French government space agency (administratively, a "public establishment of industrial and commercial character"). Its headquarters are in central Paris. CNES is the main participant on the Ariane project. Indeed, CNES designed and tested all Ariane family rockets (mainly from its centre in Évry near Paris)
The UK Space Agency is a partnership of the UK government departments which are active in space. Through the UK Space Agency, the partners provide delegates to represent the UK on the various ESA governing bodies. Each partner funds its own programme.
The Italian Space Agency (Agenzia Spaziale Italiana or ASI) was founded in 1988 to promote, co-ordinate and conduct space activities in Italy. Operating under the Ministry of the Universities and of Scientific and Technological Research, the agency cooperates with numerous entities active in space technology and with the president of the Council of Ministers. Internationally, the ASI provides Italy's delegation to the Council of the European Space Agency and to its subordinate bodies.
The German Aerospace Center (DLR) (German: Deutsches Zentrum für Luft- und Raumfahrt e. V.) is the national research centre for aviation and space flight of the Federal Republic of Germany and of other member states in the Helmholtz Association. Its extensive research and development projects are included in national and international cooperative programmes. In addition to its research projects, the centre is the assigned space agency of Germany bestowing headquarters of German space flight activities and its associates.
The Instituto Nacional de Técnica Aeroespacial (INTA) (National Institute for Aerospace Technique) is a Public Research Organisation specialised in aerospace research and technology development in Spain. Among other functions, it serves as a platform for space research and acts as a significant testing facility for the aeronautic and space sector in the country.

NASA
ESA has a long history of collaboration with NASA. Since ESA's astronaut corps was formed, the Space Shuttle has been the primary launch vehicle used by ESA's astronauts to get into space through partnership programmes with NASA. In the 1980s and 1990s, the Spacelab programme was an ESA-NASA joint research programme that had ESA develop and manufacture orbital labs for the Space Shuttle for several flights on which ESA participate with astronauts in experiments.

In robotic science mission and exploration missions, NASA has been ESA's main partner. Cassini–Huygens was a joint NASA-ESA mission, along with the Infrared Space Observatory, INTEGRAL, SOHO, and others. Also, the Hubble Space Telescope is a joint project of NASA and ESA. Future ESA-NASA joint projects include the James Webb Space Telescope and the proposed Laser Interferometer Space Antenna. NASA has supported ESA's MarcoPolo-R mission which landed on asteroid Bennu in October 2020 and is scheduled to return a sample to Earth for further analysis in 2023. NASA and ESA will also likely join for a Mars sample-return mission. In October 2020, the ESA entered into a memorandum of understanding (MOU) with NASA to work together on the Artemis program, which will provide an orbiting Lunar Gateway and also accomplish the first manned lunar landing in 50 years, whose team will include the first woman on the Moon. Astronaut selection announcements are expected within two years of the 2024 scheduled launch date. ESA also purchases seats on the NASA operated Commercial Crew Program. The first ESA astronaut to be on a Commercial Crew Program mission is Thomas Pesquet. Pesquet launched into space aboard Crew Dragon Endeavour on the Crew-2 mission. ESA also has seats on Crew-3 with Matthias Maurer and Crew-4 with Samantha Cristoforetti.

Cooperation with other space agencies
Since China has invested more money into space activities, the Chinese Space Agency has sought international partnerships. Besides the Russian Space Agency, ESA is one of its most important partners. Both space agencies cooperated in the development of the Double Star Mission. In 2017, ESA sent two astronauts to China for two weeks sea survival training with Chinese astronauts in Yantai, Shandong.

ESA entered into a major joint venture with Russia in the form of the CSTS, the preparation of French Guiana spaceport for launches of Soyuz-2 rockets and other projects. With India, ESA agreed to send instruments into space aboard the ISRO's Chandrayaan-1 in 2008. ESA is also co-operating with Japan, the most notable current project in collaboration with JAXA is the BepiColombo mission to Mercury.

International Space Station

With regard to the International Space Station (ISS), ESA is not represented by all of its member states: 11 of the 22 ESA member states currently participate in the project: Belgium, Denmark, France, Germany, Italy, Netherlands, Norway, Spain, Sweden, Switzerland and United Kingdom. Austria, Finland and Ireland chose not to participate, because of lack of interest or concerns about the expense of the project. Portugal, Luxembourg, Greece, the Czech Republic, Romania, Poland, Estonia and Hungary joined ESA after the agreement had been signed.

ESA takes part in the construction and operation of the ISS, with contributions such as Columbus, a science laboratory module that was brought into orbit by NASA's STS-122 Space Shuttle mission, and the Cupola observatory module that was completed in July 2005 by Alenia Spazio for ESA. The current estimates for the ISS are approaching €100 billion in total (development, construction and 10 years of maintaining the station) of which ESA has committed to paying €8 billion. About 90% of the costs of ESA's ISS share will be contributed by Germany (41%), France (28%) and Italy (20%). German ESA astronaut Thomas Reiter was the first long-term ISS crew member.

ESA has developed the Automated Transfer Vehicle for ISS resupply. The first ATV, Jules Verne, was launched on 9 March 2008 and on 3 April 2008 successfully docked with the ISS. This manoeuvre, considered a major technical feat, involved using automated systems to allow the ATV to track the ISS, moving at 27,000 km/h, and attach itself with an accuracy of 2 cm. Five vehicles were launched before the program ended with the launch of the fifth ATV, Georges Lemaître, in 2014.

As of 2020, the spacecraft establishing supply links to the ISS are the Russian Progress and Soyuz, Japanese Kounotori (HTV), and the United States vehicles Cargo Dragon 2 and Cygnus stemmed from the Commercial Resupply Services program.

European Life and Physical Sciences research on board the International Space Station (ISS) is mainly based on the European Programme for Life and Physical Sciences in Space programme that was initiated in 2001.

Languages
According to Annex 1, Resolution No. 8 of the ESA Convention and Council Rules of Procedure, English, French and German may be used in all meetings of the Agency, with interpretation provided into these three languages. All official documents are available in English and French with all documents concerning the ESA Council being available in German as well.

Facilities
ESA Headquarters (HQ), Paris, France
European Space Operations Centre (ESOC), Darmstadt, Germany
European Space Research and Technology Centre (ESTEC), Noordwijk, Netherlands
European Space Astronomy Centre (ESAC), Madrid, Spain
European Centre for Space Applications and Telecommunications (ECSAT), Oxfordshire, United Kingdom
European Astronaut Centre (EAC), Cologne, Germany
ESA Centre for Earth Observation (ESRIN), Frascati, Italy
Guiana Space Centre (CSG), Kourou, French Guiana
European Space Tracking Network (ESTRACK)
European Data Relay System

Link between ESA and EU

The ESA is an independent space agency and not under the jurisdiction of the European Union, although they have common goals, share funding, and work together often.
The initial aim of the European Union (EU) was to make the European Space Agency an agency of the EU by 2014. While the EU and its member states fund together 86% of the budget of ESA, it is not an EU agency. Furthermore, ESA has several non-EU members, most notably the United Kingdom which had left the EU while remaining a full member of ESA. ESA is partnered with the EU on its two current flagship space programs, the Copernicus series of Earth observation satellites and the Galileo satellite navigation system, with ESA providing technical oversight and, in the case of Copernicus, some of the funding. The EU, though, has shown an interest in expanding into new areas, whence the proposal to rename and expand its satellite navigation agency (the European GNSS Agency) into the EU Agency for the Space Programme. The proposal drew strong criticism from ESA, as it's perceived as encroaching on ESA's turf.

In January 2021, after years of acrimonious relations, EU and ESA officials mended their relationship, with the EU Internal Market commissioner Thierry Breton saying "The European space policy will continue to rely on ESA and its unique technical, engineering and science expertise,” and that “ESA will continue to be the European agency for space matters. If we are to be successful in our European strategy for space, and we will be, I will need ESA by my side." ESA director Aschbacher reciprocated, saying "I would really like to make ESA the main agency, the go-to agency of the European Commission for all its flagship programs." ESA and EUSPA are now seen to have distinct roles and competencies, which will be officialized in the Financial Framework Partnership Agreement (FFPA). Whereas ESA's focus will be on the technical elements of the EU space programs, EUSPA will handle the operational elements of those programs.

Incidents
On 3 August 1984, ESA's Paris headquarters were severely damaged and six people were hurt when a bomb exploded. It was planted by the far-left armed Action Directe group.

On 14 December 2015, hackers from Anonymous breached ESA's subdomains and leaked thousands of login credentials.

See also

European integration#Space
European Space Security and Education Centre
Eurospace
List of European Space Agency programmes and missions
List of government space agencies
SEDS
Space Night

European Union matters
Agencies of the European Union
Directorate-General for Defence Industry and Space
Enhanced co-operation
European Union Agency for the Space Programme

References

Further reading

ESA Bulletin  (ESA Bulletin ) is a quarterly magazine about the work of ESA that can be subscribed to European Space Agency  free of charge.
Bonnet, Roger; Manno, Vittorio (1994). International Cooperation in Space: The Example of the European Space Agency (Frontiers of Space). Harvard University Press. .
Johnson, Nicholas (1993). Space technologies and space science activities of member states of the European Space Agency.  .
Peeters, Walter (2000). Space Marketing: A European Perspective (Space Technology Library). .
Zabusky, Stacia (1995 and 2001). Launching Europe: An Ethnography of European Cooperation in Space Science. ISBN B00005OBX2.
Harvey, Brian (2003). Europe's Space Programme: To Ariane and Beyond. .

External links

A European strategy for space – Europa
Convention for the establishment of a European Space Agency, September 2005
Convention for the Establishment of a European Space Agency, Annex I: Privileges and Immunities
European Space Agency fonds and 'Oral History of Europe in Space' project run by the European Space Agency at the Historical Archives of the EU in Florence
Open access at the European Space Agency

 
Organizations established in 1975
International scientific organizations based in Europe
Organizations based in Paris
1975 establishments in Europe
European astronauts

Space agencies
Space policy of the European Union